Christopher Lee Grant (born 13 December 1972) is a former Australian rules football player in the Australian Football League, a legend of the Western Bulldogs and a member of the Australian Football Hall of Fame. He was born in Daylesford, Victoria, Australia.

AFL career

Grant was recruited by the Footscray Football Club (now Western Bulldogs) in the 1988 VFL Draft at pick number 105, and played his first AFL game in 1990 at the age of 17. Grant kicked 51 goals that season, the youngest player in VFL-AFL history to achieve this feat, to be the leading goalkicker for the club.

Over the following years, Grant established himself as a respected player in the half-forward position. He earned All-Australian honours in 1994 and 1996. He appeared in the 1997 documentary Year of the Dogs alongside the rest of the Footscray team. He polled 27 votes in the 1997 Brownlow Medal, one more than winner Robert Harvey; however, he was ineligible for the award due to a one-match suspension for striking Hawthorn's Nick Holland.
The incident (high contact while attempting to spoil a mark) was not deemed reportable by the umpires but Director of Football Operations Ian Collins decided Chris should be sent to the tribunal.

In 2001 he was named team captain, and was selected as a member of the Footscray & Western Bulldogs 'Team of the Century' in 2002. He missed the 2003 season to an ACL injury sustained in Round 1; his absence in the team was severely felt as the Bulldogs ended up finishing last on the AFL ladder. He relinquished the captaincy at the end of the 2004 season.

Grant played over 300 games and scored more than 500 goals throughout his career, an astonishing feat considering he spent much of his career at centre half back, playing on the game's best key forwards. He won the club best-and-fairest award in 1994 and 1996 (and came second in 1997, 1998, and 1999, and third in 2001). He gained third place in the 1996 Brownlow Medal. He received All-Australian Honours in 1997, 1998, and 1999. He was the club's leading goal-kicker in 1990 and 1994.

In playing his 330th game on 5 August 2006, Grant broke Doug Hawkins' record for most games played for the Western Bulldogs. He held the club games record until 2009, when he was passed by Brad Johnson.

Near the end of 1996 Grant was offered a large amount of money to move to Port Adelaide, but his decision to stay with the Western Bulldogs was helped along by a little boy, Ryan Adams, who sent Grant a letter with a 20-cent piece attached saying it was all he had and that Grant could keep it if he stayed with the Bulldogs.

Grant announced his retirement from senior football at the Bulldogs' best-and-fairest presentation on 2 October 2007, following a career that spanned 18 seasons and 341 games.

Chris Grant came out of retirement to represent his old club in Daylesford and in his first game of the season kicked 11 goals.

Grant continues to support the Western Bulldogs. Currently he is the Director of the Football Department.

Personal life
Grant's daughter, Isabella Grant, began playing for the Western Bulldogs' AFL Women's team in the 2020 AFL Women's season after being drafted to the club as a father-daughter selection.

Statistics

|- style="background-color: #EAEAEA"
! scope="row" style="text-align:center" | 1990
|style="text-align:center;"|
| 29 || 20 || 51 || 31 || 161 || 39 || 200 || 102 || 15 || 2.6 || 1.6 || 8.1 || 2.0 || 10.0 || 5.1 || 0.8
|- 
! scope="row" style="text-align:center" | 1991
|style="text-align:center;"|
| 29 || 15 || 18 || 15 || 113 || 77 || 190 || 75 || 7 || 1.2 || 1.0 || 7.5 || 5.1 || 12.7 || 5.0 || 0.5
|- style="background:#eaeaea;"
! scope="row" style="text-align:center" | 1992
|style="text-align:center;"|
| 29 || 24 || 50 || 28 || 249 || 140 || 389 || 133 || 36 || 2.1 || 1.2 || 10.4 || 5.8 || 16.2 || 5.5 || 1.5
|- 
! scope="row" style="text-align:center" | 1993
|style="text-align:center;"|
| 29 || 17 || 33 || 22 || 200 || 62 || 262 || 109 || 14 || 1.9 || 1.3 || 11.8 || 3.6 || 15.4 || 6.4 || 0.8
|- style="background:#eaeaea;"
! scope="row" style="text-align:center" | 1994
|style="text-align:center;"|
| 3 || 24 || 71 || 57 || 264 || 77 || 341 || 155 || 18 || 3.0 || 2.4 || 11.0 || 3.2 || 14.2 || 6.5 || 0.8
|- 
! scope="row" style="text-align:center" | 1995
|style="text-align:center;"|
| 3 || 22 || 38 || 26 || 214 || 101 || 315 || 133 || 24 || 1.7 || 1.2 || 9.7 || 4.6 || 14.3 || 6.0 || 1.1
|- style="background:#eaeaea;"
! scope="row" style="text-align:center" | 1996
|style="text-align:center;"|
| 3 || 22 || 16 || 12 || 267 || 101 || 368 || 135 || 27 || 0.7 || 0.5 || 12.1 || 4.6 || 16.7 || 6.1 || 1.2
|- 
! scope="row" style="text-align:center" | 1997
|style="text-align:center;"|
| 3 || 23 || 37 || 22 || 281 || 148 || 429 || 170 || 29 || 1.6 || 1.0 || 12.2 || 6.4 || 18.7 || 7.4 || 1.3
|- style="background:#eaeaea;"
! scope="row" style="text-align:center" | 1998
|style="text-align:center;"|
| 3 || 22 || 42 || 34 || 294 || 117 || 411 || 185 || 39 || 1.9 || 1.5 || 13.4 || 5.3 || 18.7 || 8.4 || 1.8
|- 
! scope="row" style="text-align:center" | 1999
|style="text-align:center;"|
| 3 || 24 || 37 || 29 || 284 || 137 || 421 || 176 || 33 || 1.5 || 1.2 || 11.8 || 5.7 || 17.5 || 7.3 || 1.4
|- style="background:#eaeaea;"
! scope="row" style="text-align:center" | 2000
|style="text-align:center;"|
| 3 || 17 || 40 || 20 || 193 || 70 || 263 || 105 || 24 || 2.4 || 1.2 || 11.4 || 4.1 || 15.5 || 6.2 || 1.4
|- 
! scope="row" style="text-align:center" | 2001
|style="text-align:center;"|
| 3 || 22 || 46 || 30 || 228 || 95 || 323 || 110 || 58 || 2.1 || 1.4 || 10.4 || 4.3 || 14.7 || 5.0 || 2.6
|- style="background:#eaeaea;"
! scope="row" style="text-align:center" | 2002
|style="text-align:center;"|
| 3 || 21 || 17 || 17 || 196 || 109 || 305 || 111 || 32 || 0.8 || 0.8 || 9.3 || 5.2 || 14.5 || 5.3 || 1.5
|- 
! scope="row" style="text-align:center" | 2003
|style="text-align:center;"|
| 3 || 1 || 0 || 0 || 9 || 5 || 14 || 5 || 0 || 0.0 || 0.0 || 9.0 || 5.0 || 14.0 || 5.0 || 0.0
|- style="background:#eaeaea;"
! scope="row" style="text-align:center" | 2004
|style="text-align:center;"|
| 3 || 22 || 0 || 8 || 180 || 109 || 289 || 106 || 32 || 0.0 || 0.4 || 8.2 || 5.0 || 13.1 || 4.8 || 1.5
|- 
! scope="row" style="text-align:center" | 2005
|style="text-align:center;"|
| 3 || 16 || 26 || 5 || 115 || 39 || 154 || 58 || 33 || 1.6 || 0.3 || 7.2 || 2.4 || 9.6 || 3.6 || 2.1
|- style="background:#eaeaea;"
! scope="row" style="text-align:center" | 2006
|style="text-align:center;"|
| 3 || 24 || 28 || 16 || 192 || 97 || 289 || 113 || 38 || 1.2 || 0.7 || 8.0 || 4.0 || 12.0 || 4.7 || 1.6
|- 
! scope="row" style="text-align:center" | 2007
|style="text-align:center;"|
| 3 || 5 || 4 || 2 || 36 || 15 || 51 || 22 || 7 || 0.8 || 0.4 || 7.2 || 3.0 || 10.2 || 4.4 || 1.4
|- class="sortbottom"
! colspan=3| Career
! 341
! 554
! 374
! 3476
! 1538
! 5014
! 2003
! 466
! 1.6
! 1.1
! 10.2
! 4.5
! 14.7
! 5.9
! 1.4
|}

External links

References

Western Bulldogs players
All-Australians (AFL)
Victorian State of Origin players
Charles Sutton Medal winners
Daylesford Football Club players
Australian rules footballers from Victoria (Australia)
1972 births
Living people
Australian Football Hall of Fame inductees
People from Daylesford, Victoria